Gardab-e Do (also Romanized as Gardāb-e Do) is a village in Qilab Rural District, Alvar-e Garmsiri District, Andimeshk County, Khuzestan Province, Iran. At the 2006 census, its population was 76, in 18 families.

References 

Populated places in Andimeshk County